Krasnoshchyokovo is the name of two rural localities in Russia:
Krasnoshchyokovo, Altai Krai, a selo in Krasnoshchyokovsky District of Altai Krai
Krasnoshchyokovo, Orenburg Oblast, a settlement in Kuvandyksky District of Orenburg Oblast